Yŏnsan County is a county in North Hwanghae province, North Korea.

Administrative divisions
Yŏnsan county is divided into 1 ŭp (town), 1 rodongjagu (workers' district) and 14 ri (villages):

Infrastructure 
Yonsan has a hydropower station with two generator units. The first unit commenced operation on 9 September 2008.

Transportation 
Yonsan County has a trolleybus line in Holdong-rodongjagu; it is observed to run west to a tunnel entrance from next to a building in Holdong-rodongjagu. The state of operation is unknown and no trolleybuses can be observed from satellite imagery.

Historic sites
The tomb complex of Kongp'o-ri

References

Counties of North Hwanghae